Diego Andrés Martiñones Rus (born 25 January 1985 in Montevideo), known as Diego Martiñones, is a former Uruguayan footballer who is played as a forward. He is retired from the field.

Career
In 2005 Martiñones began his professional career with Danubio F.C. During the 2008 season he transferred to Tacuarembó F.C. where he remained until the end of that season. The following year, he signed for Chilean club Cobresal, but returned to Uruguay a year after to join Central Español where he showed good form.

For the 2011 season he travelled abroad again, this time he signed with Bolivian team Blooming.

In January 2012, he returned to his home land, playing again for Danubio F.C. During the Clausura 2012 he scored 10 goals in 14 matches, calling the attention of many clubs from Argentina and Mexico you wanted to hire him.

As a result of his good performances at his return to Danubio, he was transferred to Mexican side Estudiantes Tecos in July 2012.

Notes

References

External links
 
 
 

1985 births
Living people
Uruguayan footballers
Uruguayan expatriate footballers
Association football midfielders
Danubio F.C. players
Tacuarembó F.C. players
Cobresal footballers
Central Español players
Club Blooming players
Tecos F.C. footballers
San Martín de San Juan footballers
Talleres de Córdoba footballers
Racing Club de Montevideo players
Villa Teresa players
Liverpool F.C. (Montevideo) players
Montevideo City Torque players
Rampla Juniors players
Gimnasia y Esgrima de Jujuy footballers
Uruguayan Primera División players
Chilean Primera División players
Argentine Primera División players
Primera Nacional players
Torneo Federal A players
Bolivian Primera División players
Uruguayan expatriate sportspeople in Chile
Uruguayan expatriate sportspeople in Argentina
Uruguayan expatriate sportspeople in Bolivia
Uruguayan expatriate sportspeople in Mexico
Expatriate footballers in Chile
Expatriate footballers in Argentina
Expatriate footballers in Bolivia
Expatriate footballers in Mexico